Valery Grigoryan was the former chairman for the Azerbaijan Communist Party for the Karabakh Autonomous Oblast committee.

Grigoryan was killed in Stepanakert, Nagorno-Karabakh. The KGB office had reported that he was killed by opponents of the Armenian-Azerbaijani truce. Grigoryan was part of a group that would meet with the president of Azerbaijan, Ayaz Mutalibov.

References

1991 deaths
People from Stepanakert
Year of birth missing